The 1844 Salta earthquake took place in the Province of Salta, in the Republic of Argentina, on 18 October at 23:00 UTC. It had an estimated magnitude of 6.5 . The earthquake had an estimated hypocentral depth of 30 km.

Damage and casualties
The Province of Salta is an area of high seismic activity. The last major earthquake to have affected the area prior to the October 1844 event was in 1692. The destructive force of the 1844 Salta earthquake was measured at VII on the Mercalli intensity scale. It impacted several villages in the Province of Salta as well as the capital city. It caused damage and several families were affected but there was no reported loss of life. The earthquake caused damage not only in Salta, but also in Jujuy, Tucumán and Santiago del Estero. Several aftershocks were felt after the initial tremor. Cracks opened in the ground creating new channels through which water flowed even up to 26 October. The final aftershock was felt on the 27th.

Aftermath
On feeling the tremors the villagers rushed to the main square and then towards the Cathedral where they removed the statues of Christ and the Virgen del Milagro to the plaza. There they prostrated before the images and prayed.

Although the Fiesta del Milagro has its origins in the 1692 Salta earthquake, in which the images of Christ and the Virgen del Milagro were said to have saved the city from the earthquakes, it was not until 1845, a year the following the 1844 earthquake, that ecclesiastical authorities along with the Government of the Province, signed the so-called Pact of Allegiance (Pacta de Fidelidad). In this pact the village agreed to officiate the acts of the Fiesta de Milagro (Feast of the Miracle), with novena and processions every September 15. The primitive "Fiestas del Milagro" in Salta were filled with celebration and excess. But it is from 1935, after the severe restrictions imposed by the Archbishop Tavella, that these "excesses" were banned and the feast took on the character of penance and atonement.

See also
 List of earthquakes in Argentina
 List of historical earthquakes

References

1844
1844
1844
1844 disasters in Argentina